The ABS Aerolight Legacy is a French powered parachute that was designed and produced by ABS Aerolight of Sérignan-du-Comtat. Now out of production, when it was available the aircraft was supplied as a complete ready-to-fly-aircraft and as a kit for amateur construction.

The company appears to have gone out of business in late 2007 and production ended.

Design and development
It features a  parachute-style wing, two-seats-in-side-by-side configuration in a semi-enclosed cockpit, tricycle landing gear and a single  Hirth F-30 four-cylinder, horizontally opposed, two-stroke, aircraft engine in pusher configuration.

The aircraft carriage is built from composites. In flight steering is accomplished via a steering wheel that actuates the canopy brakes, creating roll and yaw. The main landing gear incorporates suspension and a cockpit heater was a factory option.

Specifications (Legacy)

References

Legacy
2000s French sport aircraft
2000s French ultralight aircraft
Single-engined pusher aircraft
Powered parachutes